Lysiloma candidum, most commonly known as the palo blanco, is a tree of the family Fabaceae near-endemic to the Baja California Peninsula in Mexico. It has compound leaves with oval gray-green leaflets. The creamy-white, globose clusters of flowers bloom in March through May and perfume the air with a light, spicy fragrance. This species is distributed throughout the Baja California Peninsula, from Rancho El Barril in southern Baja California state to the Cape region of Baja California Sur, and is also very rarely found in the state of Sonora.

Description 
The bark is smooth and silvery white, but dark on the small branches. The compound leaves are 3 to 7 cm long, with 1 to 3 pairs of pinnae. Each pinnae has 5 to 17 pairs of gray-green to blue-green oval leaflets, 8 to 22 mm long. The pinnate veins continue to the margin. The stipules are leaf-like, shaped oblong, oblique, and 6 to 15 mm long.

The bracts are small and caducous. The flowers are capitate, with the heads pedunculate in short racemes or clusters. The bracteoles are similar to the calyx lobes but shorter. The calyx is 3 mm long, and the corolla is 3.5 mm long. The corolla and calyx lobes are pubescent (covered in hairs) and are thickened at the tip. There are 40 to 50 stamens united in a tube. The flowers form globose clusters of flowers with a creamy-white color, blooming from March through May. The flowers give off a light, spicy fragrance in the air around the plant.

The fruit is a pod, suspended on a short stipe, hanging gracefully off of the slender branches. The pod is 8 to 15 cm long, and 25 to 30 mm wide, smooth, and reddish-brown. The thin walls of the pod fall away during dehiscence.

Taxonomy 
This species was described by Townshend Stith Brandegee in 1889.

Distribution and habitat 
This plant is a near-endemic to the Baja California Peninsula in Mexico, with a small occurrence in Sonora. On the peninsula, it occurs from Rancho El Barril in southeast Baja California state, along the gulf side of the peninsula into Baja California Sur, reaching the Cape region. It is also found on the adjacent islands in the Gulf of California. In Sonora, it is found on the west coast facing the Gulf.

Gallery

References 

candidum
Trees of Baja California
Trees of Baja California Sur
Trees of Sonora
Endemic flora of Mexico
Taxa named by Townshend Stith Brandegee
Taxa described in 1889